Wheeler Peak is the tallest mountain in the Snake Range and in White Pine County, in Nevada, United States. The summit elevation of  makes it the second-highest peak in Nevada, just behind Boundary Peak. The mountain is located in Great Basin National Park and was named for George Wheeler, leader of the Wheeler Survey of the late 19th century.

Peak features
Wheeler Peak has an impressive headwall above a large glacial cirque, large moraines and an active rock glacier. The top of the mountain is covered by deep snow most of the year. A paved road runs from the Great Basin National Park visitor center to several small camping areas, the highest more than halfway up the mountain.  The mountain's prominence is due to a Miocene detachment fault that brought the deep Cambrian Prospect Mountain quartzite to the top of the mountain.

Doso Doyabi 
In 1854–1855,  Lieutenant Colonel Edward Steptoe named what is now Wheeler Peak in honor of Jefferson Davis. Davis was then serving as Secretary of War in the United States government. In 1869, during the Wheeler Survey, it was proposed that the peak be named after  George Wheeler. Wheeler states that the idea was abandoned when it was learned that in 1859 James H. Simpson had suggested naming the peak "Union", though the Wheeler name was later used for the primary peak.
In January 2019 the Nevada State Board on Geographic Names approved changing the name of Jeff Davis Peak to Doso Doyabi, which means White Mountain in Shoshone;
later that year, the change was approved by the United States Board on Geographic Names.

Access 
A well-maintained trail, the Wheeler Peak Summit Trail, leads from a trail-head near the end of Wheeler Peak Scenic Drive directly to the summit, making for a  hike. Afternoon storms are likely during the summer.

Wheeler Peak vs. Boundary Peak 
The distinction of highest point in Nevada goes to the summit of Boundary Peak, so named because it is just east of the Nevada-California border, at the northern terminus of the White Mountains. Wheeler Peak is, however, the tallest independent mountain in the state since Boundary Peak is considered a subsidiary summit of Montgomery Peak, whose summit is in California.

It is also the twelfth most topographically isolated summit in the contiguous United States.

Nearby features 

The limestone Lehman Caves, at the base of the mountain, feature a large collection of shield formations.  Tours of the caves are offered year round by the National Park Service.  Higher up on the glacial moraine is a grove of ancient Great Basin Bristlecone Pines of great age. A Bristlecone Pine named Prometheus, which was at least 4,862 years old and the oldest known non-clonal organism, grew here before it was inadvertently cut down in 1964 as part of a research  project. Limber Pine, which can live for over 1,000 years, are also found in the area.

See also
 List of Ultras of the United States
 List of highest points in Nevada by county

References

External links

 
 

Great Basin National Park
Mountains of Nevada
Highest points of United States national parks
Mountains of the Great Basin
Mountains of White Pine County, Nevada